Onychogomphus is a genus of dragonflies in the family Gomphidae. They are commonly known as Pincertails.

Species
The genus contains the following species:

References

External links

Richard Gabb – Onychogomphus assimilis – European Dragonfly Photos and information

Gomphidae
Anisoptera genera
Taxa named by Edmond de Sélys Longchamps
Taxonomy articles created by Polbot